Crash Proof: How to Profit From the Coming Economic Collapse is an investment book by American investment broker, Peter Schiff.

Description
The book, published in 2007, just before the 2008 financial crisis predicted an imminent decline in the value of the American dollar and advised investment in foreign securities and precious metals.  After the recession of 2008, he published an updated version of the book called Crash Proof 2.0 which in January 2010 was listed on the New York Times best-seller list.

References

Economic forecasting
2007 non-fiction books
Finance books